Xavier College Preparatory High School is a private, Roman Catholic, Jesuit high school in Riverside County, California's Coachella Valley. It is located in the unincorporated Thousand Palms area, just outside the northern city limits of Palm Desert. The school falls within the Roman Catholic Diocese of San Bernardino and is the first lay-built, Jesuit-endorsed high school of its kind. It is associated with the six other Jesuit high schools in the state of California.

Academics 
Xavier College Prep was established in 2006 with 48 freshman students. In 2009–2010 the first senior class had 60 graduates, all of whom went on to college. As of 2022, Xavier College Prep has over 576 students in 9th, 10th, 11th, and 12th grade, and a student to teacher ratio of 10:1. Tuition is $15,000, with 50% of students receiving need-based aid. The student profile for the school is 51% female, 49% male, and 48% minority. Xavier admits students on the basis of their ability to succeed in a college preparatory environment. The school does not rank its students. For admission, students must submit an application, references, transcripts, and sit for the High School Placement Test (HSPT). Incoming students must also have an interview with the admissions committee.

Sports 
The sports teams are known as the Saints and compete in the Desert Empire League.  Average enrollment in DEL high schools exceeds 2,000 with some exceeding 3,000. This makes Xavier the smallest, with about 600 students. Xavier manages to continually field competitive teams in every sport.

The Saints' Cross Country boys' team won the 2014 State Championship and the girls finished tenth in their respective Division 5 races at the 2010 CIF Cross Country State Finals in Fresno, California.

In 2011, the Xavier College Prep girls' cross country team were the first sport team from the school to earn a Desert Valley League title.

References

External links 
 

Catholic secondary schools in California
Educational institutions established in 2006
2006 establishments in California
Jesuit high schools in the United States
High schools in Riverside County, California
Palm Desert, California
Thousand Palms, California